Yerunkar is an Indian family surname found amongst 96-Kuli Kshatriya Maratha caste belonging to Hindu religion.

People with Yerunkar surname from Western Maharashtra have their origins in Konkan region. The alternate surname for Yerunkar is Ghadge.  

The forefathers of Yerunkar have worked in different capacities with Maratha Warrior King Chhatrapati Shivaji Maharaj in conquering important forts like Raigad,Sinhagad, Pratap Gad , Sindhudurga, etc., across the country.

Some important relatives of Yerunkar are Kadam, More, Ghosalkar, Darekar, Belose, Sawant, Pawar, Desai, Dalvi, Rane, Bhosale, Surve, Shinde, Chavan, etc.

Indian surnames